Iheanacho is both a given name and surname. Notable people with the name include:

Iheanacho Obioma, Nigerian politician
Emmanuel Iheanacho, Nigerian politician
Ifeoma Iheanacho (born 1988), Nigerian wrestler
Kelechi Iheanacho (born 1996), Nigerian footballer
Kelechi Iheanacho (footballer, born 1981), Nigerian footballer